is a Japanese animated television series which aired 26 episodes between May 2004 and March 2005. Set during Japan's Edo period, the story follows three characters-tea waitress Fuu, vagrant outlaw Mugen, and ronin Jin-as they travel the country in search of a samurai who smells of sunflowers. The series was created and directed by Shinichirō Watanabe and produced by Manglobe. The character designer and animation director was Kazuto Nakazawa, with the series story created by Shinji Obara and Yukihiko Tsutsumi of Office Crescendo. The scripts were written by Obara, Dai Satō, Touko Machida, Keiko Nobumoto, Seiko Takagi, Ryota Sugi, Nakazawa and Watanabe.

The first seventeen episodes of Samurai Champloo premiered on Fuji TV on May 20, 2004, with its broadcast being cancelled on September 9. The series, complete with the remaining episodes referred to as a "second season", was broadcast on BS Fuji from January 22 to March 19, 2005. It saw subsequent international broadcast on Adult Swim (United States), Razer (Canada), SBS TV (Australia), Animax (mainland Asia), and Viceland (United Kingdom).

The series was first released on DVD by Victor Entertainment through its JVC label across thirteen volumes between August 21, 2004, and August 25, 2005. A complete collection was released for DVD and Blu-ray in July 2011. In North America, Geneon Entertainment published the series on seven volumes between January 11 and January 17, 2006. A complete collection was released on July 4. It was later published in the region by Funimation on DVD in 2009 and on Blu-ray in 2019. The series was published by MVM Entertainment the United Kingdom, originally in seven volumes September 5, 2005, and October 16, 2006, then as a complete collection on September 3, 2007. In Australia, a complete for Blu-ray was published by Madman Entertainment on June 15, 2011.

Episode list

References

Bibliography

Notes

External links
Official Madman Entertainment Samurai Champloo web site
Funimation Samurai Champloo web site
Official Samurai Champloo website

Samurai Champloo
Samurai Champloo